Billboard Most-Played Race Records of 1946 is a year-end chart compiled by Billboard magazine ranking the year's top race records based on the number of times the record was played on the nation's juke boxes.Billboard assigned point totals to each record based on its juke box plays. 

"Hey! Ba-Ba-Re-Bop" from Lionel Hampton & His Orchestra was the year's No. 1 record with 120 points, ranking more than 40 points higher than any other record.

Louis Jordan and His Tympany Five led all other artists with 11 records on the year-end chart, including "Choo Choo Ch'Boogie" (No. 2) and "Stone Cold Dead in the Market (He Had It Coming)" with Ella Fitzgerald (No. 3). Billboard ranked Jordan's band as the year's top race record band with 385 points, more than triple the total of the second place band (Lionel Hampton & His Orchestra with 128 points).

Decca Records led all other labels with 17 records, including the top four, on the year-end chart. Capitol Records ranked second with five records followed by RCA Victor (four) and  Exclusive (three).

See also
Billboard year-end top pop records of 1946
Billboard Most-Played Folk Records of 1946
1946 in music

References

1946 record charts
Billboard charts
1946 in American music